Ithalukalkappuram is a 2017 Malayalam-language Indian Short film directed by Amal Joy Arukulasseril, starring Lalu James Varghese, Kavya Madhav, Abhin Siddharth, Neethu Krishna, Jithin S Thomas and Raja Laxmi. The film released on YouTube had 1 million views within one week, a record for Malayalam short film industry.

Director Amal Joy Arukulasseril complained that the film was uploaded by several channels without official permission and he expressed regret on the same.

Summary

Ithalukalkappuram tells a love story of Aby and Annie, but unexpected happenings in their life makes them realize the true life.

Cast

Lalu James Varghese
Kavya Madhav
Abhin Siddharth
Neethu Krishna
Jithin S Thomas
Raja Laxmi

Production
The shooting of the film was completed in a span of 3 days time from 28 to 30 December 2016.

References

External links
 

2017 films
2010s Malayalam-language films
Indian short films
Indian romance films
2017 romance films
2017 short films